Facundo Panceyra Garrido (Córdoba, 24 November 1990) is an Argentine rugby union player.
His usual position is as a Centre and he currently plays for Valorugby Emilia in Italian Top10.

From 2012 to 2014 he was named in the Argentina Sevens for World Rugby Sevens Series and Rugby World Cup Sevens.

References 

Eurosport Profile
It's Rugby England Profile
All Rugby Profile
ESPN Profile

1990 births
Argentine rugby union players
Living people
Rugby union centres
Sportspeople from Córdoba, Argentina